Jelks is a surname. Notable people with the surname include:

Amanda Jelks (born 1986), American actress
Andrew Jelks (born 1993), American football player
Edward B. Jelks (born 1922), American archaeologist
Greg Jelks (1961–2017), American-born Australian baseball player
Jalen Jelks (born 1996), American football player
John Earl Jelks, American actor
Mark Jelks (born 1984), American track and field athlete
Na'Taki Osborne Jelks, American environmental scientist
Simone Jelks (born March 9, 1986), American basketball referee
William D. Jelks (1855–1931), American newspaper editor, publisher, and politician